ABL may refer to:

In medicine
 ABL (gene), a proto-oncogene associated with chronic myelogenous leukemia
 Abetalipoproteinemia, a rare genetic disorder
 Accidental bowel leakage, also known as fecal incontinence

Computing
 A Block diagram Language, a hardware description language
 Advanced Business Language, the new name for Progress 4GL
 OpenEdge Advanced Business Language, a business application development language created and maintained by Progress Software Corporation

Sports
 African Basketball League
 Alaska Baseball League
 American Basketball League, a name that has been used by three defunct basketball leagues in the United States:
American Basketball League (1925–55), an early professional basketball league
American Basketball League (1961–63), a league that only played a single full season
American Basketball League (1996–98), a women's basketball league
American Basketball League (2013), a semi-professional men's basketball league
 ASEAN Basketball League, a professional basketball league for ASEAN nations
 Australian Baseball League:
 Australian Baseball League (1989–99) (defunct)
 Australian Baseball League
 AL-Bank Ligaen, a former name for Denmark's top men's ice hockey league

Entertainment
 A Beautiful Lie, 30 Seconds to Mars's second studio album
 A Bug's Life, a 1998 film
 A Bug's Life (video game), the video game based on the film

Military and weaponry
 Airborne Laser, a weapons system designed for use by the United States military
 Allegany Ballistics Laboratory
 Armored Box Launcher, a launch container for the BGM-109 Tomahawk cruise missile

Companies, groups, organizations
 ABL Space Systems
 Alameda Belt Line railroad
 Air Busan of South Korea (ICAO airline code)
 NSW Business Chamber, formerly Australian Business Limited, a business organisation
 Academia Brasileira de Letras (Brazilian Academy of Letters)

Other uses
Activity-based learning, a range of pedagogical approaches to teaching based on doing some hands-on experiment and activities
 Ablative case
 Asset-based lending
 Ambler Airport in Alaska (IATA airport code)
 Atmospheric boundary layer, the region where the atmosphere interacts with the surface of the earth
 Australian bat lyssavirus, a rabies-like virus found in Australian bats
 Lampung Nyo language, an Austronesian language of Indonesia, by ISO 639-3 language code

See also

 
 
 AB1 (disambiguation)
 ABI (disambiguation)
 able (disambiguation)